Langenau (Württ) station is a railway station in the municipality of Langenau, located in the Alb-Donau-Kreis in Baden-Württemberg, Germany.

References

Railway stations in Baden-Württemberg
Buildings and structures in Alb-Donau-Kreis